The Fujifilm FinePix S and HS-series of digital cameras consists of the company's DSLR system and bridge camera models.

Current models
Bridge cameras: (as of 26 November 2016)
 Fujifilm FinePix S9900W / Fujifilm FinePix S9800

Discontinued models

DSLR system:
 FinePix IS Pro
 Fujifilm FinePix S1 Pro (Not to be confused with the FinePix S1 bridge camera of 2014)
 Fujifilm FinePix S2 Pro
 Fujifilm FinePix S3 Pro
 Fujifilm FinePix S5 Pro

Bridge cameras:
 Fujifilm FinePix S2900 series
 Fujifilm FinePix S3200 / Fujifilm FinePix S3280
 Fujifilm FinePix S3300 / Fujifilm FinePix S3380
 Fujifilm FinePix S3400
 Fujifilm FinePix S4000 / Fujifilm FinePix S4080
 Fujifilm FinePix S4200
 Fujifilm FinePix S4500
 Fujifilm FinePix SL240 / Fujifilm FinePix SL300
 Fujifilm FinePix HS series
 Fujifilm FinePix S1000FD
 Fujifilm FinePix S100fs
 Fujifilm FinePix S602 Zoom
 Fujifilm Finepix S1500
 Fujifilm FinePix S1600 / Fujifilm Finepix S1730 / Fujifilm FinePix S1770
 Fujifilm Finepix S1800 / Fujifilm FinePix S1880
 Fujifilm FinePix S2000HD
 Fujifilm FinePix S2500HD / Fujifilm FinePix S2600HD
 Fujifilm FinePix S2550HD
 Fujifilm Finepix S2800HD / Fujifilm FinePix S2900HD
 Fujifilm FinePix S200EXR
 Fujifilm FinePix S3000
 Fujifilm FinePix S3100
 Fujifilm FinePix S3500
 Fujifilm FinePix S5000 Zoom
 Fujifilm FinePix S5100
 Fujifilm FinePix S5200
 Fujifilm FinePix S5500
 Fujifilm FinePix S5800
 Fujifilm FinePix S600 / Fujifilm FinePix S5600
 Fujifilm FinePix S700
 Fujifilm FinePix S5700
 Fujifilm FinePix S800 / Fujifilm Finepix S5800
 Fujifilm FinePix S6000fd / Fujifilm FinePix S6500fd
 Fujifilm FinePix S7000
 Fujifilm FinePix S8000
 Fujifilm FinePix S8100fd
 Fujifilm FinePix S9000
 Fujifilm FinePix S9100
 Fujifilm FinePix S9500
 Fujifilm FinePix HS10 / Fujifilm FinePix HS11
  Fujifilm FinePix S1 (Not to be confused with the FinePix S1 Pro DSLR of 2000)

See also 
 Fujifilm FinePix
 Fujifilm cameras
 Fujifilm

References

S-series
Year of introduction missing